Kuwait–Turkey relations are foreign relations between Turkey and Kuwait. The Ministry of Foreign Affairs in Turkey describes the current relations as being at "outstanding levels". Bilateral trade between the two countries in 2016 was estimated to be worth around US$700 million by the Turkish Deputy Prime Minister, Mehmet Simek.

The two countries have recently signed fifteen agreements for cooperation in tourism, health, environment, economy, commercial exchange and oil.

When Turkey was struck by an earthquake in 2011, Kuwait donated 250,000 dollars for the victims through the UN Development Programme (UNDP).

In October 2018 Turkey and Kuwait signed a joint defense plan for 2019 aimed at enhancing military cooperation between the two countries.

History 
Kuwait used to be under Ottoman rule until Kuwait became a British protectorate in 1899 named Anglo-Kuwaiti Agreement of 1899.

See also 
 Foreign relations of Kuwait
 Foreign relations of Turkey
 Turks in Kuwait

References

External links 

 
Turkey
Bilateral relations of Turkey
Relations of colonizer and former colony